Lipiany may refer to the following places in Poland:
Lipiany, a town in West Pomeranian Voivodeship
Lipiany, Lower Silesian Voivodeship, a village in Gmina Bolesławiec, Lower Silesian Voivodeship

See also
 Lipan (disambiguation)
 Lipany (disambiguation)
 Lipiny (disambiguation)